Pribislavec (Kajkavian: Prslavec) is a village and municipality in Međimurje County, in northern Croatia.

History
Pribislavec is first mentioned in the 14th century as possessio Pobozlouhaza as possession of Lacković noble family. In charter issued in year 1478 village is recorded as Pribislawecz. Its name is derived from personal name Pribislav of Slavic origin.

In year 1870 count Juraj Feštetić built Neo-Gothic castle in the village.

Municipality of Pribislavec was established in year 2001.

2019 Antiziganist Demonstrations
Group led by Alen Pancer, veteran of the Croatian War of Independence, announced antiziganist demonstrations under the title "I want normal life" for 1 June 2019 at the county's administrative center in Čakovec. Veljko Kajtazi, Romani of Croatia community' MP in the Croatian Parliament, expressed his surprise with singling out of Roma which disturbed the entire community. MP expressed his dissatisfaction with the fact that the Town of Čakovec did not permit the follow up response demonstration for the next day. Kajtazi's press conference in the Croatian Parliament was interrupted by Croatian Growth MP Hrvoje Zekanović. Independent Serb weekly Novosti wrote that organizer of the demonstration is an activist of Željka Markić and sympathizer of Ruža Tomašić associated with nationalist and right wing groups. Kajtazi underlined that "extreme right-wingers and people who spread hate messages...are not the people who will solve the problem..." Organizers denied antiziganist nature of the demonstration stating that even "among the Roma there are honorable and honest people". European Roma Rights Centre called upon authorities of the Međimurje County to clarify why do they support demonstration stating that it is unacceptable for a multicultural, democratic and antifascist state to tolerate demonstrations against entire groups of people. Prior to gathering, demonstration were condemned by the President of the Union of Roma in Croatia Suzana Krčmar, elected representative of the Međimurje Roma community Matija Oršuš. Pribislavec Municipality Mayoress Višnja Ivačić expressed her full support to demonstration and invited other municipalities in the county to join in.

Demographics

In the 2021 census, the Pribislavec had a population of 2,963. Pribislavec is experiencing population decline since the 2010s. The majority of inhabitants are Croats making up 72% of population and most significant minority are Roma people (26%).

Sports

Pribislavec has an own football club, NK Polet Pribislavec, whose home ground is located in the western part of the village. It has a capacity of around 1,000 and is equipped with floodlighting. The club won the Međimurje County First League in 2010 and were promoted to the Croatian Fourth League.

Pribislavec Airfield is a small sports airfield located between Pribislavec and Belica. It has one grassy runway and is mostly used by light aircraft and gliders. There is also an annual air show at the airfield in August. A kart circuit is also located between Pribislavec and Belica, next to the airfield.

See also
 Feštetić Castle

References

External links
  

Municipalities of Croatia
Populated places in Međimurje County